The following lists events that happened during 1934 in Southern Rhodesia.

Incumbents
 Prime Minister: Godfrey Huggins

Events
 The African National Council is formed under the leadership of Aaron Jacha

Births
 July 27 – Didymus Mutasa, politician
 September 3 – Dorothy Masuka, jazz singer

Deaths

 
Years of the 20th century in Southern Rhodesia
Southern Rhodesia
Southern Rhodesia
1930s in Southern Rhodesia